WLXX (101.5 MHz) is a commercial FM radio station licensed to Richmond, Kentucky, and serving the Lexington metropolitan area. The station is owned by Cumulus Media. It subscribes to the nationally syndicated JACK FM radio service, using the slogan "Playing What We Want!" The playlist is mostly rock hits from the 1980s, '90s and early 2000s, but includes pop and novelty hits from the last 50 years. Unlike most music stations, WLXX does not have DJs, but uses the prerecorded voice of Howard Cogan to make humorous and sometimes sarcastic quips. The station Program Director is Anthony "Twitch" Longo.

WLXX's studios and offices are in the Kincaid Towers in Downtown Lexington. The transmitter is off Igo Road, near Interstate 75, in rural Madison County just south of the Kentucky River.

History
On May 12, 1972, the station signed on as WCBR-FM. It mostly simulcast co-owned WCBR 1110 AM. WCBR-FM was owned by Parker Broadcasting and originally was heard on 101.7 MHz. In the 1980s, it switched to 101.5 MHz, getting a boost in power.

In 1999, the station was acquired by current owner Cumulus Media. The station switched to a sports radio format as WLRO.

The WVLK-FM call letters were assigned by the Federal Communications Commission on May 23, 2007. From 1979 to 2003, co-owned 92.9 WVLK-FM held the WVLK-FM call sign.

From 2007 to 2014, 101.5 WVLK-FM simulcast sister station WVLK 590 AM in Lexington, giving that talk station an FM outlet for listeners who prefer FM radio. On October 31, 2014, at 6 AM, WVLK-FM dropped its talk programming and began stunting by playing only music by Garth Brooks as "Garth 101.5". At 5 pm that day, WVLK-FM changed its format to country music, joining the Nash Icon network as "101.5 Nash Icon".

On the morning of February 20, 2018, WVLK-FM flipped to adult hits as "101.5 Jack FM".

On September 4, 2020, WVLK-FM swapped call letters with WLXX.

References

External links

LXX
Radio stations established in 1972
Cumulus Media radio stations
Adult hits radio stations in the United States
Jack FM stations
1972 establishments in Kentucky
Richmond, Kentucky